Bryan Avila (born June 25, 1984) is an American Republican politician who currently serves as a member of the Florida Senate, representing the 39th District. He previously served in the Florida House of Representatives, representing the 111th District, which includes parts of Miami and Hialeah in northeastern Miami-Dade County, since 2014. Avila will be term limited in 2022 and has announced his intention to run for Miami Dade County commission district 6.

History
Avila was born in Hialeah, Florida. He graduated from Miami Springs High School in 2002. He attended Miami Dade College, receiving his associates degree in 2004, and graduated from the University of Miami with a bachelor's degree in political science in 2006. Avila went on to attend Florida International University, where he graduated with a Master's degree in Criminal Justice as well as a Master of Public Administration degree in 2010. In 2011, Avila was appointed to serve on the Planning and Zoning Board for the City of Hialeah. The following year, he was appointed to the city's Scholarship Board. In 2013, Avila was elected as the vice-chairman of the Republican Party of Miami-Dade County and served until his election to the Florida House of Representatives. Avila is married to his high school sweetheart, Cindy Gil-Avila. In 2015, their daughter, Olivia, was born.

Campaign for State House
In 2014, Avila ran to succeed incumbent State Representative Eduardo González, who was unable to seek re-election due to Florida term limits. He faced Alexander Anthony, a former candidate for Mayor in Miami Springs in the Republican primary. Avila campaigned on improving the state's economy, cutting taxes, expanding educational opportunities, reducing the size of government, and eliminating corporate welfare. He earned the endorsement of the Miami Herald, which, though it recommended his candidacy, criticized his opposition to Medicaid expansion under the Patient Protection and Affordable Care Act. Avila ended up defeating Anthony by a wide margin. He won the Republican primary with 60% of the vote and advanced to the general election, where he faced Mariano Corcilli, the Democratic nominee. This time, he did not earn the endorsement of the Miami Herald, which supported his opponent over his opposition to Medicaid expansion. Ultimately, it was not a close election with Avila defeating Corcilli in a landslide, winning 67% of the vote.

Florida House of Representatives

During his first term in office, Avila authored pieces of legislation such as providing a property-tax exemption for low-income seniors, streamlining the tax appeals process, establishing in-state tuition for all active duty service members, reforming HIV testing, and implementing distance requirements for Assisted Living Facilities. In 2016, Avila ran for re-election and defeated Sevi Miyar, the Democratic nominee and a high school teacher. Avila was recognized for his accomplishments during his first term in office and received the endorsement of the Miami Herald, which praised him as a rising star. He went on to win 59% of the vote and was sworn in for his second term on November 22, 2016.

Campaign for the Miami Dade County Commission
Term limited from his house seat in 2022, Avila announced his candidacy for Miami Dade County Commission District 6. The incumbent, longtime Commissioner Rebecca Sosa will also be term-limited making the seat open for the first time since Sosa won in 2001. Avila's only other opponent in the race is diversity consultant Ibis Valdes. However he would reverse his decision and instead run for the Florida Senate.

Florida Senate
After withdrawing from the race for Miami-Dade Commissioner, he instead ran for an open seat in the 39th District, which was left vacant by fellow Republican Manny Díaz Jr. who was appointed by governor Ron DeSantis as Florida's Commissioner of Education, winning right away in November 8, 2022 as he faced no opposition.

References

External links
Florida House of Representatives - Bryan Avila
Bryan Avila for State Representative

1984 births
21st-century American politicians
American politicians of Cuban descent
Florida International University alumni
Hispanic and Latino American state legislators in Florida
Latino conservatism in the United States
Living people
Republican Party members of the Florida House of Representatives
Republican Party Florida state senators
People from Hialeah, Florida
University of Miami alumni